Little Sturgeon is an unincorporated census-designated place located on the Little Sturgeon Bay, in the town of Gardner, in Door County, Wisconsin. As of the 2010 census, its population was 136. Little Sturgeon has an annual festival known as "Little Sturgeon Days" that features a parade and other live entertainment.

Climate

References

External links
Little Sturgeon Website
History of Little Sturgeon (Archived August 16, 2018)

Census-designated places in Wisconsin
Census-designated places in Door County, Wisconsin